A garnish is an item or substance used as a decoration or embellishment accompanying a prepared food dish or drink. In many cases, it may give added or contrasting flavor.  Some garnishes are selected mainly to augment the visual impact of the plate, while others are selected specifically for the flavor they may impart. This is in contrast to a condiment, a prepared sauce added to another food item primarily for its flavor. A food item which is served with garnish may be described as being garni, the French term for "garnished."

Many garnishes are not intended to be eaten, though for some it is fine to do so. Parsley is an example of a traditional garnish; this pungent green herb has small distinctly shaped leaves, firm stems, and is easy to trim into a garnish.

Overview
A garnish makes food or drink items more visually appealing. They may, for example, enhance their color, such as when paprika is sprinkled on a salmon salad. They may provide a color contrast, for example when chives are sprinkled on potatoes. They may make a cocktail more visually appealing, such as when a cocktail umbrella is added to an exotic drink, or when a Mai Tai is topped with any number of tropical fruit pieces. Sushi may be garnished with baran, a type of plastic grass or leaf. Sometimes a garnish and a condiment will be used together to finish the presentation of a dish; for example, an entrée could be topped with a sauce, as the condiment, along with a sprig of parsley as a garnish.

A garnish may be so readily identified with a specific dish that the dish may appear incomplete without the garnish. Examples include a banana split sundae with cherries on top or buffalo wings served with celery stick garnish and blue cheese dressing.

List of garnishes

Foods and entree
Garnishes for foods and entrees include:

 Amandine – a culinary term indicating a garnish of almonds
 Bawang goreng – crisp fried shallot, a common garnish in Indonesian cuisine
Carrot
 Caviar
 Sun dried tomato
 Celery
 Chives
 Chili pepper – julienne, rings or decoratively sliced 
 Chili threads
 Cilantro – coriander leaves
 Crouton
 Cucumber – julienne, rings or decoratively sliced 
 Duxelles
 Egg garnish
 Fried onion – used as a garnish on steaks and other foods
 Gremolata
 Lemon basil
 Radish
 Manchette
 Microgreens – young vegetable greens that are used both as a visual and flavor component, ingredient and garnish
 Mint
 Nuts
 Olive oil – drizzled olive oil is used to garnish some foods
 Ginger
 Parsley
 Persillade
 Sautéed mushrooms – used on steaks and other foods
 Edible seaweed – such as shredded nori sheet, used to garnish foods such as soups, entrees and sashimi
 Sesame seeds
 Walnut

Desserts and sweets
Garnishes for desserts and sweets include:

 Caramel 
 Chocolate (shaved or curled)
 Cocoa powder
 Flaked coconut
 
  (raspberry coulis, for example)
 s
 
 
 
 
 
 
 s
 
 
 Nuts
 Walnut pieces and candied walnuts
 Wedding cake topper
 Whipped cream

Beverages
Garnishes for beverages include:

Coffee-based drinks may have:
 Cinnamon sticks or ground powder
 Cocoa powder

Savory drinks such as Bloody Mary may have:
 Carrot sticks
 Celery stalks (usually with leaves attached)
 Pepper
 Salt, coarse (applied to the rim of glasses)

Eggnog may have:
Nutmeg, grated

Various fruits are used:
 Cherries
 Lemon slice, twist, or wedge
 Lime slice, twist, or wedge
 Orange slice, twist, or wedge
 Pineapple slice or wedge
 
  wedge
 
 
 
 
 
 
 Sugar, granulated or powdered

Garnishes according to cuisine traditions

French garnishes
Classic French garnishes include

For soups:

 Brunoise  – one to three mm diced vegetables
 Chiffonade – finely shredded lettuce or sorrel stewed in butter 
 Croutes – small pieces of halved French bread buttered and oven dried
 Coulis – (a thicker soup) drizzled decoratively
 Croutons – small pieces of bread (typically cubes) fried in butter or other oil
 Julienne – thinly sliced vegetables
 Pasta (tapioca, sago, salep) etc. 
 Pluches – a whole leaf spray of herbs, without the central stalk (traditionally chervil)
 Profiterolles – puff pastry stuffed with purée
 Royale – a small decoratively shaped piece of egg custard (in German this is called an Eierstich)
 Threaded eggs 
For relevés and entrées:
 Croquettes
 Potatoes (pommes dauphine, Duchess potatoes or Marquis)
 Duxelles – fried onion, mushrooms and herbs
 Matignon – minced carrots, onions, and celeries with ham stewed in butter and Madeira
 Mirepoix – similar to Matignon but diced (cf. minced) with or without ham (or with bacon substituted for the ham)
 Polonaise – Polish-style garnish with melted butter, bread crumbs, chopped boiled egg, lemon juice and herbs over cooked vegetables
 Salpicon – a variety of other diced meats or vegetables
 Fritters

Indonesian garnishes

 Bawang goreng – crisp fried shallot, a common garnish in Indonesian cuisine
 Young carrot leaf
 Celery – locally known as daun seledri used as topping for soups or rice congee
 Chili pepper – sliced decoratively
 Cilantro
 Cucumber – sliced decoratively
 Flaked coconut – grated coconut flesh, usually used in traditional kue sweet dessert snacks; such as klepon, putu and lupis
 Emping – melinjo nut crackers
 Krupuk – various traditional crackers
 Lemon basil – locally known as daun kemangi
 Tomato – sliced decoratively

Japanese garnishes

 Beni shōga – julienne pickled ginger, usually used as a garnish for gyudon and okonomiyaki
 Gari – marinated thinly sliced ginger, usually used as a garnish for sushi and sashimi
 Katsuobushi – dried bonito flakes,  usually used as a garnish for takoyaki
 Scallion or tree onion (wakegi) – mostly used as topping of tofu and miso soup
 Various edible seaweed – including thinly sliced nori sheets, used mostly as topping of ramen, udon or soba
 Sesame seeds – sprinkled on steamed rice or noodles
 Shiso leaf

Korean garnishes

In Korean cuisine, decorative garnishes are referred to as gomyeong, means to decorate or embellish food.
 Chrysanthemum leaves 
 Egg garnish – a common topping in Korean cuisine, made with egg whites and egg yolks.
 Gochu – red chili pepper
 Chili thread – a traditional Korean garnish made with chili peppers.
 Crushed garlic
 Green onions 
 Manna lichen
 Scallions 
 Shiitake
 Shredded vegetables

Garnish tools
Tools often used for creating food garnishes include skewers, knives, graters, toothpicks, and parchment cones.

Gallery

See also

 Cake decorating
 Cocktail garnish
 Food presentation
 Garde manger
 Hors d'oeuvre
 Tuile

References

External links

 How to Garnish Food. WikiHow
 HowToGarnish.com

Food and drink decorations
Culinary terminology